Owaissa may refer to:

USS Owaissa (SP-659), a United States Navy patrol vessel
Owaissa, Temagami, an area in the municipality of Temagami, Ontario, Canada